Celal is both a masculine Turkish given name and a surname. It is the Turkish form of the Arabic word Jalal (جلال), which means "majesty". Notable people with the name include:

Given name
 Celal Al (born 1984), Turkish actor
 Celal Esat Arseven (1875–1971), Turkish painter, writer and politician
 Celal Atik (1918–1979), Turkish sports wrestler
 Celâl Bayar (1883–1986), Turkish politician
 Celal İbrahim (1884–1917), Ottoman football player
 Celal Nuri İleri (1881–1938), Turkish politician
 Celal Kandemiroglu (1953–2022), video game specialist 
 Celal Şahin (1925–2018), Turkish musician and humorist
 Celâl Şengör (born 1955), Turkish geologist
 Celal Yardımcı (1911–1986), Turkish lawyer and politician

Middle name
 Hasan Celal Güzel (1945–2018), Turkish politician

Surname
 Peride Celal (1916–2013), Turkish female novelist, story writer

Turkish-language surnames
Turkish masculine given names